Mohamed Mehdi Bensaid (born 26 October 1984) is Moroccan Minister of Youth, Culture and Communication. He was appointed as Minister on 7 October 2021.

Education 
Bensaid holds a Master in African Affairs from the Sciences Po, a Master in International Relations from the Institut français des relations internationales and a Master in International Relations from the Institut d'études politiques de Toulouse.

References

Further reading

1984 births
Living people
21st-century Moroccan politicians
Moroccan politicians
Government ministers of Morocco

Sciences Po alumni